The black-breasted myzomela or red-rumped myzomela (Myzomela vulnerata) is a species of bird in the family Meliphagidae.
It is found on Timor island.
Its natural habitat is subtropical or tropical dry forests.

References

red-breasted myzomela
Birds of Timor
red-breasted myzomela
Taxonomy articles created by Polbot